Berish Blumenfeld (1779–1853) was a Galician Jewish Hebraist.

He was the author of a German translation of the Book of Job, which he published with a Hebrew commentary (Vienna, 1826). A poem, "Motar ha-Adam", by Blumenfeld, was published in Bikkure ha-'Ittim. He also published the works of Eliakim ben Judah ha-Milzahgi under the title Sefer Ravyah (Ofen, 1837).

Blumenfeld's views on the authorship and date of Job were the subject of a correspondence with Samuel David Luzzatto, who insisted that Job was one of the oldest books of the canon. Blumenfeld corresponded as well with Isaac Baer Levinsohn and assisted in the spread of the latter's works.

References
 

1779 births
1853 deaths
Hebraists
Hebrew–German translators
Jews from Galicia (Eastern Europe)
People of the Haskalah
Translators of the Bible into German